Matthias Mededues-Badohu is an Anglican bishop  in Ghana: he was Bishop of Dunkwa-on-Offin and is the current Anglican Bishop of Ho.

References

Anglican bishops of Dunkwa-on-Offin
21st-century Anglican bishops in Ghana

Year of birth missing (living people)
Living people
Anglican bishops of Ho